Ivo Karlović was the defending champion, but lost in the first round to Quentin Halys.

Sam Querrey won the title, defeating Thanasi Kokkinakis in the final, 6–3, 3–6, 6–2.

Seeds
The top four seeds receive a bye into the second round.

Draw

Finals

Top half

Bottom half

Qualifying

Seeds

Qualifiers

Lucky loser
  Brydan Klein

First qualifier

Second qualifier

Third qualifier

Fourth qualifier

References
 Main draw
 Qualifying draw

2017 ATP World Tour
2017 Singles